Serhii Fedorovych Filimonov (born September 20, 1994, Kyiv) is a Ukrainian public figure, a veteran of the Russian-Ukrainian war, leader of the Honor movement, former leader of the Kyiv branch of the Azov Civil Corps and the Kyiv branch of the far-right National Corps party, organizer and participant of activist initiatives against urban construction, in support of political prisoners and victims of political crimes. He played the lead role in the film "Rhino" by Ukrainian director Oleg Sentsov. He has been described as a far right influencer, he was a strong advocate of Ukrainian sovereignty during the leadup to the invasion, and he put his acting career on hold to fight against the 2022 Russian invasion of Ukraine.

Public activity 
After returning from the front in 2015, he became one of the organizers of the peaceful public action "Blockade of Crimea".

In 2015 - Chairman of the NGO "Civil Corps of Azov" in Kyiv.

In 2015 - one of the founders of the informal youth movement "Honor".

In 2016, he was the head of the Kyiv branch of the National Corps political party.

From 2015 to 2017, he launched a number of public projects, including: 
"Zooprotection", aimed to combat animal cruelty, support shelters and fight against dog hunters; 
"One Blood" - a project to collect donated blood for children and wounded soldiers; "Our Future" - helping children left without parental care, a number of sports and educational initiatives.

Filimonov organized "Lessons of Courage": special lectures for students on patriotism and military training.

In 2018, Filimonov took part in the detention of Rafael Lusvarghi, a Brazilian LPR / DPR mercenary.

In the spring of 2019, he resigned as head of the Kyiv branch of the National Corps political party.

He took an uncompromising position on illegal construction in Kyiv. He was the organizer of numerous direct actions and information campaigns against the construction of Narbut Square, Protasov Gorge, Hay Market, Sviatoshynsky Lane, Oskorka Eco-Park, Krister Hill, Chornobylska Street, against the construction on Andriyivskyy Descent, participated in the struggle for the museum on Post Square.   On January 14, 2022, unknown people spray-painted Filimonov's house and car and threw a pig's head in the yard. Sergei blamed the owner of the construction company StolitsaGrup Vladislav Molchanov. According to Sergei, developers offered him for the waiver of shares from 50 thousand to 1 million dollars  .

In November–December 2019, he and his comrades took part in the riots in Hong Kong .

He was an active participant of the initiative "Who put the contract on Katya Handziuk?" – a public initiative created by friends of an activist Kateryna Handziuk a few days after the attack on her. Activists were attending court hearings on the case and were following the steps of the investigation in order to punish all those involved in Katya's murder.

On February 24, 2021, together with his colleagues from the Honor Kyiv organization, he broke into the meeting room of the Kramatorsk City Council during a session and clashed with representatives of the Shariy Party fraction in the City Council when they came with posters in support of Anatoly Shariy. For actively opposing a well-known pro-Russian propagandist, he came into the field of view of the Russian propaganda machine.

In March 2021, he organized the action "Can't you hear? You will see” in support of Serhii Sternenko, a public figure whose illegal imprisonment has sparked a wave of protests and peaceful actions across the country.

In 2021, by a joint decision of the Ukrainian School of Political Studies (USPS) and Viktor Handziuk, after consultations with civil society representatives, Serhii Filimonov received a scholarship for a civic position named after Kateryna Handziuk: "Annual Kateryna Handziuk scholarship for civic position" was founded by USPS in 2019, Katya was a graduate of the School in 2015.

During the 2022 Russian invasion of Ukraine he fought with Azov Battalion for Ukraine

RHINO 

Filimonov played the lead role in the film RHINO by Ukrainian director Oleh Sentsov.
RHINO is the second feature film by the Ukrainian director Oleh Sentsov. In 2012, the film was already presented at the industry platform of the Sofia International Film Festival, where it received awards for Best Project and Best Pitching. However, work on the film was suspended due to Sentsov's illegal arrest by Russian security services in 2014 and his subsequent imprisonment. Work on the project was resumed after the release of the director in 2019. The world premiere of Rhino is scheduled take place on September 10, 2021, at the 78th Venice Film Festival in the Orizzonti section.

Filming of RHINO took place in Kryvyi Rih, Lviv and Kyiv and wrapped in December 2020.
The film is a co-production of Ukraine, Poland and Germany.

At the Stockholm International Film Festival 2021 Filimonov won the best actor category and RHINO best film.

References 

1994 births
Living people
Ukrainian independence activists
Actors from Kyiv
21st-century Ukrainian male actors
Ukrainian male film actors
Ukrainian activists
People of the Russo-Ukrainian War
Far-right politics in Ukraine